Keith Nolan (born 11 January 1973) is an Irish professional golfer. Nolan has been a member of the PGA Tour and Nationwide Tour.

Nolan was born in Bray, Ireland. He attended East Tennessee State University (ETSU) in the United States on a golf scholarship, where he studied Communications and was awarded All-American honors. 

He had a successful amateur golf career which included winning both the Irish matchplay and strokeplay championships and representing Great Britain and Ireland in the 1997 Walker Cup.

He also represented Ireland at the 1997 European Amateur Team Championship on home soil at Portmarnock Golf Club, were he won the 36-hole stroke-play competition individually.

Since turning professional at the end of 1997, Nolan has competed on both the PGA Tour and its official development tour, the Nationwide Tour. Having found little success in tournament golf, he has also worked as an assistant coach at ETSU as well as caddying for Garrett Willis on the PGA Tour.

Amateur wins
1996 Irish Amateur Open Championship
1997 Irish Amateur Open Championship

Team appearances
Amateur
European Youths' Team Championship (representing Ireland): 1994 (winners)
Eisenhower Trophy (representing Great Britain & Ireland): 1996
European Amateur Team Championship (representing Ireland): 1995, 1997
St Andrews Trophy (representing Great Britain & Ireland): 1996 (winners)
Palmer Cup (representing Great Britain & Ireland): 1997
Walker Cup (representing Great Britain & Ireland): 1997

See also
1997 PGA Tour Qualifying School graduates
1999 PGA Tour Qualifying School graduates

References

External links

Irish male golfers
East Tennessee State Buccaneers men's golfers
PGA Tour golfers
Caddies
People from Bray, County Wicklow
Sportspeople from County Wicklow
Golfers from Knoxville, Tennessee
1973 births
Living people